Events from the year 1962 in China.

Incumbents
 Chairman of the Chinese Communist Party – Mao Zedong
 President of the People's Republic of China – Liu Shaoqi
 Premier of the People's Republic of China – Zhou Enlai
 Chairman of the National People's Congress – Zhu De
 Vice President of the People's Republic of China – Soong Ching-ling and Dong Biwu
 Vice Premier of the People's Republic of China – Chen Yun

Governors  
 Governor of Anhui Province – Huang Yan
 Governor of Fujian Province – 
 until unknown: Wu Hongxiang
 month unknown: Jiang Yizhen
 starting month unknown: Wei Jinshui 
 Governor of Gansu Province – Deng Baoshan
 Governor of Guangdong Province – Chen Yu 
 Governor of Guizhou Province – Zhou Lin
 Governor of Hebei Province – Liu Zihou 
 Governor of Heilongjiang Province – Li Fanwu
 Governor of Henan Province – Wu Zhipu then Wen Minsheng 
 Governor of Hubei Province – Zhang Tixue 
 Governor of Hunan Province – Cheng Qian 
 Governor of Jiangsu Province – Hui Yuyu 
 Governor of Jiangxi Province – Shao Shiping 
 Governor of Jilin Province – Li Youwen 
 Governor of Liaoning Province – Huang Oudong 
 Governor of Qinghai Province – Yuan Renyuan
 Governor of Shaanxi Province – Zhao Boping 
 Governor of Shandong Province – Tan Qilong 
 Governor of Shanxi Province – Wei Heng 
 Governor of Sichuan Province – Li Dazhang
 Governor of Yunnan Province – Ding Yichuan
 Governor of Zhejiang Province – Zhou Jianren

Events 

 Four Pests campaign

Establishments 

 Yiling Senior High School
 Beijing Language and Culture University
 Chinese Xiangqi Association
 Hundred Flowers Awards
 Nanning Wuxu International Airport

Births 

 December - Li Xi
 January - Wang Xiaodong
 June 9 - Zhu Minzhu
 July 28 - Liang Weifen
 November 28 - Ma Yongfeng

Deaths 

 Li Jieren
 Lei Feng
 Long Yun
 Li Kenong
 Lu Dachang

See also
Timeline of Chinese history
1962 in Chinese film